Atlantagrotis aethes is a moth of the family Noctuidae. It is found in the Magallanes Region of Chile and the Patagonia and Santa Cruz regions of Argentina.

The wingspan is about 34 mm.

External links
 Noctuinae of Chile

Noctuinae
Moths described in 1885